Britt Christina Marinette Lindberg (born 6 December 1950) is a Swedish journalist known internationally for her work as an actress and glamour model in the late 1960s and early 1970s.

Biography
Lindberg grew up in a working-class home in Annedal, Gothenburg, together with her sister and three brothers. She studied Latin at school and planned to continue her studies in archeology.

Modeling career
During her high school years (she was around 18 years old) she started posing nude for men's magazines, such as FIB aktuellt and Lektyr, after having garnered some attention posing in bathing suits for newspapers. She later appeared in men's magazines such as Penthouse (UK), Playboy (U.S.), Lui (France) and Mayfair (UK). She was a Penthouse Pet in the June 1970 issue of Penthouse.

Film career
Lindberg has appeared or starred in 26 feature films, most of which are erotica, exploitation or softcore pictures. Her first movie was an American production (Maid in Sweden), filmed in Sweden with a Swedish cast. She got her second role in Jan Halldoff's comedy Rötmånad which was released in 1970. The film was seen by over 250,000 Swedes and went on to become a commercial success. Her third film, Exponerad, was released with a lot of hype at the Cannes festival in 1971 and turned her into an international celebrity.

A long string of exploitation films followed, many of which were filmed in Germany and Japan. As part of the marketing campaign for Exponerad she also went on a publicity trip to Japan, which later resulted in an invitation to appear in Japanese exploitation films. In Japan she played a major supporting role in Norifumi Suzuki's Pink film classic Sex & Fury. In 1972 she starred as Madeleine in Bo A. Vibenius's controversial film Thriller – en grym film. Director Quentin Tarantino expressed his admiration for both the film and Lindberg's performance, and Madeleine later served as the basis for Daryl Hannah's character Elle Driver in Tarantino's Kill Bill films.

Lindberg did not like that nude pictures were getting more and more explicit and during the filming of Gerard Damiano's Flossie (AKA Natalie—not to be confused with a 1974 film of the same name, which was directed by Mac Ahlberg and starred Marie Forså) in West Germany—she left the set and returned home to Sweden. Damiano (who also directed the infamous Deep Throat) persuaded Lindberg to leave because he knew that it was going to be a hardcore film. For several years the German producer tried to bring her back in an attempt to complete the film. According to Videooze (No. 8, 1996), about 1,000 meters of film had been shot by Damiano. Production stopped and never resumed.

After a long absence from acting she appeared in the 2016 thriller Lindangens Park, the 2018 horror movie Svart Cirkel, which was directed by Adrian Garcia Bogliano and in 2020 in the sci-fi feature Pandemonic.

Post film career
In her introduction to Daniel Ekeroth's book Swedish Sensationsfilms: A Clandestine History of Sex, Thrillers, and Kicker Cinema, Christina Lindberg explains that after leaving exploitation films behind, she has been busy with numerous other projects. In 1972 she met future fiancé Bo Sehlberg and later started to work for his aviation magazine Flygrevyn. When Sehlberg died in 2004, Lindberg took over ownership and the position as editor-in-chief of the magazine—which is the largest aviation magazine in Scandinavia. She has also produced an instructional video on how to pick and prepare mushrooms, Christinas Svampskola, and is very passionate about preserving the Swedish wolf. She made an attempt to enter the theater school Scenskolan in 1975 after having taken private lessons from Öllegård Wellton, but failed after having passed two out of three tests. She continued posing and writing for men's magazines while studying journalism at Poppius, and she eventually established herself as a journalist.

Selected filmography
Note: The films have been listed in order of production, based on Lindberg's diary.

References

External links

Cristina Lindberg Interview at DBCult Film Institute 
Biography at the Swedish Film Institute (Note: In Swedish only)
Biography (revised version) on (re)Search my Trash
Interview on dvdtimes.co.uk (March 2006)
 Biography Psychovision.net

1950 births
Living people
Swedish film actresses
Swedish female adult models
Penthouse Pets
Swedish journalists
Swedish magazine editors
People from Gothenburg
Women magazine editors
Swedish women journalists
People from Andalusia, Alabama
20th-century Swedish actresses